Paulo Alves may refer to:

Paulo Alves (footballer, born 1969), Portuguese former football forward and coach
Paulo Alves (footballer, born 1993), Portuguese football midfielder
Paulão (footballer, born 1969), Angolan former football midfielder